Rafael Alves Targino (born 3 February 1989), most known as Rafael or Rafael Paraíba, is a Brazilian striker who currently a free agent.

Biography
Rafael left on loan to Campeonato Gaúcho side Brasil de Pelotas in January 2009. In July 2009 he left for Croatian side Hajduk Split along with Thiaguinho. On 15 July 2010 he signed a 1-year contract with Turkish First League side Mersin İdmanyurdu, but returned to Brazil in September 2010, signed a 1-year contract with Cerâmica. He played 10 matches for the team at 2010 Copa FGF., scored 2 goals.

References

External links
 
 
 CBF  

1989 births
Living people
Brazilian footballers
Brazilian expatriate footballers
Sport Club Internacional players
Grêmio Foot-Ball Porto Alegrense players
Grêmio Esportivo Brasil players
HNK Hajduk Split players
Cerâmica Atlético Clube players
Croatian Football League players
Association football forwards
Expatriate footballers in Croatia
Sportspeople from Paraíba